Ian Britton (born 20 December 1956) is an English former football player and manager and current rugby union coach.

Career
Britton played football for Birmingham City, Walsall, Telford United, AP Leamington and Kidderminster Harriers. He became a youth team coach at Kidderminster and also managed Bridgnorth Town and Redditch United, before he succeeded Jan Mølby as Kidderminster manager in March 2002. Originally appointed on a caretaker basis, he was manager until 2003. He went on to be Stratford Town manager before converting to rugby union.

References

External links

1956 births
Living people
Footballers from Bristol
English footballers
Association football midfielders
Birmingham City F.C. players
Walsall F.C. players
Telford United F.C. players
Leamington F.C. players
Kidderminster Harriers F.C. players
English football managers
Bridgnorth Town F.C. managers
Redditch United F.C. managers
Kidderminster Harriers F.C. managers
Stratford Town F.C. managers
English Football League managers